Sharawi Gomaa (1920–1988) was an Egyptian military officer who served in various posts, including governor of Suez, deputy prime minister and minister of interior, during the presidency of Gamal Abdel Nasser. He was part of the May Group who were removed from the office by Anwar Sadat in May 1971.

Biography
Gomaa was born in 1920. He graduated from the Military College. He obtained a master's degree in military sciences 1951. Then he worked as a teacher at the Military College. He joined the General Intelligence Directorate serving as its deputy director between 1957 and 1961. Next he was appointed governor of Suez in 1961 which he held until 1964. In 1966 he was named as the minister of interior and deputy prime minister. He replaced Zakaria Mohieddin as interior minister. During his term as interior minister Gomaa established the Police Cadets Institute in late 1960s.

Gomaa was the secretary general of the Arab Socialist Union in 1969 and was part of its secret unit, the Socialist Vanguard (Arabic: al-Tanzim al-Tali‘i), which was also called the Vanguard Organization. This unit was established in 1963 was headed by Gomaa and Sami Sharaf. As of 1971 Gomaa was one of the Vanguard secretariat's ten members. Gomaa resigned from his post as interior minister with other Nasser supporters in the cabinet in May 1971. These officials are called the May Group. 

Following this incident Gomaa was arrested and tried due to his alleged participation in the planned coup against Sadat. He was sentenced to death, but in December 1971 his sentence was reduced to life imprisonment.

Gomaa was an anti-communist and supported the establishment of a capitalist state. He died on 28 November 1988.

References

External links

1920 births
1988 deaths
Arab Socialist Union (Egypt) politicians
Egyptian anti-communists
Egyptian Military Academy alumni
Egyptian prisoners sentenced to death
Interior Ministers of Egypt
Egyptian prisoners sentenced to life imprisonment